is a Japanese political and comedy drama series that first aired on FUJI TV in 1997. It stars Masakazu Tamura. The drama set in a fictional country. It was written by Japanese playwright Kōki Mitani. Mitani directed similar political and comedy film Hit me Anyone One More Time in 2019.

Plot
The new Prime Minister is incompetent and self-centered, and very unpopular with the people. He is on the verge of resigning. The Prime Minister and his staff struggle not to be the shortest cabinet in history at all costs.

Cast
 Masakazu Tamura : Prime Minister
 Masahiko Nishimura : Chief Administrative Officer and Secretary  
 Honami Suzuki : Mrs. Prime Minister
 Michitaka Tstutsui : Chief Cabinet Secretary
 Masao Komatsu : Servant
 Kōji Nakamoto : Deputy Secretary-General of the Cabinet Secretariat
 Aiko Satō ; Daughter of Prime Minister
 Keiko Toda : Secretary
 Hozumi Gōda : Secretary
 Morio Kazama : Mrs. Prime Minister's secret lover
 Masanari Nihei : SP
 Katsuya Kobayashi : Chief of Staff
 Katsuhiko Sasaki : Chairman of Diet Affairs Committee
 Shunji Fujimura : Deputy Prime Minister
 Mayu Tsuruta : Maid

References

1997 Japanese television series debuts
1997 Japanese television series endings
Japanese drama television series
Television shows written by Kôki Mitani
Political drama television series
Japanese comedy television series
Fuji TV dramas
Political comedy television series